Hypsibius dujardini sensu lato is a species complex of tardigrade in the class Eutardigrada. A member of this complex, Hypsibius exemplaris, is widely used for various research projects pertaining to evolutionary biology and astrobiology.

H. exemplaris was differentiated from H. dujardini sensu stricto in 2018. Earlier studies refer to this lab species from northwest England as H. dujardini. H. dujardini s.s. is found in France, and has differences in 18S rRNA sequence and morphological details.

Habitat 
The species, Hypsibius dujardini, is a tardigrade that prefers freshwater lakes, rivers, and streams. Because they are considered cosmopolitan, their geographical range is immense. They can be found in regions like the tropics and the poles.

Genome sequencing
The genome of Hypsibius exemplaris has been sequenced. Hypsibius exemplaris has a compact genome and a generation time of about two weeks. It can be cultured indefinitely and cryopreserved.

References

External links 
 Tardigrada Newsletter
 Tardigrades - Pictures and Movies
 The Edinburgh Tardigrade project
  Tardigrades (English/German)
 Hypsibius dujardini and the evolution of development

Hypsibiidae
Animals described in 1840